Beaver Airport may refer to:

 Beaver Airport in Beaver, Alaska, United States (FAA/IATA: WBQ)
 Beaver Municipal Airport (Oklahoma) in Beaver, Oklahoma, United States (FAA: K44)
 Beaver Municipal Airport (Utah) in Beaver, Utah, United States (FAA: U52)

See also 
 Beaver County Airport in Beaver Falls, Pennsylvania, United States (FAA: BVI, IATA: BFP)
 Beaver Island Airport in Beaver Island, Michigan, United States (FAA: SJX)
 Welke Airport in Beaver Island, Michigan, United States (FAA: 6Y8)
 Beaver Marsh State Airport in Beaver Marsh, Oregon, United States (FAA: 2S2)
 Beaver Lake Seaplane Base in Big Lake, Alaska, United States (FAA: D71)
 Bear Creek 3 Airport in Beaver Creek, Alaska, United States (FAA: Z48, IATA: BCC)
 Beaver Creek Airport in Beaver Creek, Yukon, Canada (IATA: YXQ)